The United States Virgin Islands competed at the 2013 World Championships in Athletics in Moscow, Russia, from 10–18 August 2013. Eddie Lovett was the Virgin Islands' sole athlete, competing in the 110m hurdles. Lovett was eliminated in the heats.

References

External links
IAAF World Championships – U.S. Virgin Islands

Nations at the 2013 World Championships in Athletics
World Championships in Athletics
United States Virgin Islands at the World Championships in Athletics